The Kangaroo Island, part of the Petrel Group,  is a  unpopulated island, located in the Bass Strait, close to the Robbins Island, in north-west Tasmania, in south-eastern Australia.

The island has been used for grazing cattle and is surrounded by extensive mudflats.

Fauna
Pied oystercatchers breed on the island, which is also home to the Tasmanian pademelon.  The island and its mudflats are important for feeding and roosting waders.

References

Islands of North West Tasmania
Localities of Circular Head Council
Islands of Bass Strait